Richard Oakes may refer to:

Richard Oakes (activist) (1942–1972), Mohawk Native American leader of the 1969–71 occupation of Alcatraz Island
Richard Oakes (guitarist) (born 1976), English musician and former member of the band Suede